Trading Hearts is a 1988 American comedy film directed by Neil Leifer and starring Raul Julia and Beverly D'Angelo.

Plot
Set in the 1950s in Florida, a popular young baseball pitcher (Julia) is forced to retire.  He finds solace in a divorced nightclub singer. Her precocious daughter thinks the pair belong together.

Cast
Raul Julia as Vinnie Iacona
Beverly D'Angelo as Donna Nottingham
Jenny Lewis as Yvonne Rhonda Nottingham
Parris Buckner	as Robert Nottingham

Reception
Leonard Maltin gave the film one and a half stars.

References

External links
 
 

American comedy films
Films scored by Stanley Myers
1980s English-language films
1980s American films